Miscera resumptana is a moth in the family Brachodidae. It was described by Francis Walker in 1863. It is found in Australia.

References

Brachodidae
Moths described in 1863